Trzeszczyna is a settlement in the administrative district of Gmina Łobez, within Łobez County, West Pomeranian Voivodeship, in north-western Poland. Trzeszczyna is a part of the sołectwo of Dalno. The village has a population of 40.

The settlement developed as a result of fusion of the lands which belonged to a merchant from Łobez named Borchardt. In Trzeszczyna there is a park, which is noted in the heritage register.

Between 1975 and 1998 Trzeszczyna was a part of Szczecin Voivodeship.

References 

Trzeszczyna